Alexander Poe (born March 21, 1974) is a bobsledder who represented the United States Virgin Islands. He competed in the four-man event at the 1994 Winter Olympics.

References

1974 births
Living people
United States Virgin Islands male bobsledders
Olympic bobsledders of the United States Virgin Islands
Bobsledders at the 1994 Winter Olympics
Place of birth missing (living people)